Rabbit Hill, also referred to as Knoll Hill, is a  located in Knoll Park (also known as Knoll Open Space), which is among the highest peaks in Newbury Park, California that are not parts of the Santa Monica Mountains. It is reached from a trailhead on North Reino Road, just across the road from the Pepper Tree Playfields, which provides hikers to Rabbit Hill with parking spaces. The sloping Knoll Trail (Pepper Tree Vista Trail) goes from N. Reino Rd. to the top of the knoll, which offers panoramic views of Newbury Park, Casa Conejo, Boney Mountain, Thousand Oaks and Conejo Mountain. The total park area is  including the hill, which is covered with coastal sage scrub and grassland.

Sources 

Newbury Park, California
Hills of California
Mountains of Ventura County, California
Mountains of Southern California